The Sumathi Best Teledrama Cameraman Award is presented annually in Sri Lanka by the Sumathi Group of Companies for the best Sri Lankan cameraman in television.

The award was first given in 1995. Following is a list of the winners since then.

References

Cameraman